Severe acute respiratory syndrome outbreak may refer to:

2002–2004 SARS outbreak, caused by SARS-CoV-1
COVID-19 pandemic, the outbreak caused by SARS-CoV-2

See also
Severe acute respiratory syndrome
Middle East respiratory syndrome outbreak (disambiguation)